Johan Mikael Eklund (born 14 September 1981), known as Mikael Eklund, is a Swedish footballer who plays for IK Brage as a defender.

Career
Eklund started his career in Forssa BK of Borlänge. Eklund got his breakthrough when playing for IK Brage in Superettan, and he signed for Kalmar FF in 2003. He won the Swedish championship, Allsvenskan, in 2008 with Kalmar FF.

References

External links
 
  

Living people
1981 births
Swedish footballers
IK Brage players
Kalmar FF players
Assyriska FF players
Mikael Eklund
Forssa BK players
Association football defenders
People from Borlänge Municipality
Sportspeople from Dalarna County